Wife vs. Secretary (or Wife Versus Secretary) is a 1936 American romantic comedy-drama film directed and co-produced by Clarence Brown and starring Clark Gable as a successful businessman, Jean Harlow as his secretary, and Myrna Loy as his wife, supported by James Stewart, in one of his first memorable roles, as the secretary's suitor. The film was the fifth of six collaborations between Gable and Harlow and the fourth of seven between Gable and Loy. May Robson portrays Gable's character's meddling mother. The story was based on the short story of the same title by Faith Baldwin, published in Cosmopolitan magazine in May 1935. The screenplay was written by Norman Krasna, John Lee Mahin and Alice Duer Miller.

Plot
Magazine publisher Van Stanhope (Clark Gable) and his wife, Linda (Myrna Loy), are celebrating their third wedding anniversary. They are very much in love and Van gives Linda a diamond bracelet. However, Van's secretary, the beautiful Helen "Whitey" Wilson (Jean Harlow), is thought by Van's mother (May Robson) to be a temptation to Van. Linda refuses to listen to all of her friends and Van's mother as she trusts Van. In truth, she has all the reason in the world to trust him, as his relationship with Whitey is strictly business.

Meanwhile, Whitey's beau, Dave (James Stewart), is very uncomfortable about her relationship with Van as he calls one night while they're having dinner to ask that Whitey help him finish work at a party. When Dave asks Whitey to marry him, Whitey refuses, and buries herself further in her work.

When Van has to be very secretive to buy J. D. Underwood's (George Barbier) weekly, for fear that his rival will buy it instead, only Whitey is permitted to know, providing still more conflict between Van and his wife.

When Van returns from his business meeting with Underwood, and tells Linda that he has been at the club all day, Linda discovers that he has not been at the club but rather has been out with Whitey, who was merely helping him prepare for his discussion with Underwood. At a skating party, Linda is too sick to skate. As Van and Whitey skate together, Linda hears from one of the wives there that Van and Whitey are most likely having an affair. When Linda and Van get into the car, they fight when Linda requests that Van have Whitey moved to another employer. Van refuses and Linda ignores him for the rest of the evening until she calls him back to make up.

Van plans a trip for himself and Linda, but when he learns that Underwood is at a conference in Havana, changes his plans and won't permit Linda to accompany him while he works. Whitey learns of important information regarding the rival paper, which results in Van bringing her to Havana to close the deal. While celebrating the successful closing of the deal, they develop a drunken attraction to each other but do not consummate this attraction. When Linda calls at 2 am, Whitey answers the phone, and she assumes they are having an affair.

Van returns to New York only to have Linda ignoring him entirely and asking for a divorce. Lonely, he asks Whitey to accompany him to Bermuda as a friend, which she, having fallen in love with Van, agrees to. But, realizing that Van will never love her as much as he loves Linda, Whitey visits her on the ship that Linda has planned to take to Europe. Whitey challenges her to go back to Van, telling her that she would be a fool to let him go. After resistance, Linda meets him in his office, and they make up. Whitey is then met by Dave, and they make up as well.

Cast
 Clark Gable as Van 'V.S.'/'Jake' Stanhope
 Jean Harlow as Helen 'Whitey' Wilson
 Myrna Loy as Linda Stanhope
 May Robson as Mimi Stanhope
 George Barbier as J.D. Underwood
 James Stewart as Dave
 Hobart Cavanaugh as Joe
 John Qualen as Mr. Jenkins
 Tom Dugan as Finney
 Gilbert Emery as Simpson
 Marjorie Gateson as Eve Merritt
 Gloria Holden as Joan Carstairs
 Eugene Borden as Ship's Officer (uncredited)

Notes
Wife vs. Secretary was the fifth collaboration of Gable and Harlow and the fourth of Gable and Loy. The picture was the first time that Harlow and Loy worked together; they would both appear as well in Libeled Lady later in 1936, also starring William Powell and Spencer Tracy, with Harlow billed first.

On Harlow during the making of Wife vs. Secretary, Loy said, "Jean was beautiful, but far from the raucous sexpot of her films. As a matter of fact, she began to shake that image in Wife vs. Secretary....She'd begged for a role that didn't require spouting slang and modeling lingerie. She even convinced them to darken her hair a shade, in hopes of toning down that brash image. It worked. She's really wonderful in the picture and her popularity wasn't diminished one bit. Actually we did kind of a reversal in that picture. Jean, supposedly the other woman, stayed very proper, while I had one foot in bed throughout. That's the sexiest wife I've ever played. In one scene, Clark stands outside my bedroom door and we banter, nothing more, but there's just no question about what they've done the night before. Clarence Brown, our director, made it all so subtle, yet, oh, so wonderfully suggestive. (In fact, the only vulgarity in the picture is in the breakfast scene, where I discover a diamond bracelet that Clark has hidden in the brook trout I'm about to eat. It didn't seem chic or funny to me—merely messy, typical of Hollywood's misguided notion of upper-class sophistication. I tried to get them to take it out, but they wouldn't. Needless to say, it's the scene everyone remembers, so what do I know?). Where sex is concerned, the double entendre, the ambiguity, it seems to me, is much more effective than being too explicit. This is something the moviemakers don't seem to understand today."

James Stewart, meanwhile, spoke of his scene in the car with Harlow, saying, "Clarence Brown, the director, wasn't too pleased by the way I did the smooching. He made us repeat the scene about half a dozen times...I botched it up on purpose. That Jean Harlow sure was a good kisser. I realized that until then I had never been really kissed."  Despite being billed sixth in the cast, Stewart enjoys the most screen time aside from the three leads, mainly romantic sequences with Harlow, including the final scene and dialogue in the movie.

Box office
According to MGM records the film earned $1,350,000 in the US and Canada and $717,000 elsewhere, resulting in a profit of $876,000.

References

External links
 
 
 
 

1936 films
1936 comedy-drama films
1936 romantic comedy films
1936 romantic drama films
1930s American films
1930s English-language films
1930s romantic comedy-drama films
American black-and-white films
American romantic comedy-drama films
Films based on short fiction
Films based on works by Faith Baldwin
Films directed by Clarence Brown
Films scored by Edward Ward (composer)
Films scored by Herbert Stothart
Films set in New York City
Films set in Cuba
Metro-Goldwyn-Mayer films